Glasgow Public Library, also known as Lewis Library, is a historic library building located at Glasgow, Howard County, Missouri.  It was built in 1866, and is a two-story, Italianate style brick building.  It features round-arched windows and doors,  and a high bracketed cornice with its broad overhanging roof.  It is the oldest Missouri library in continuous use. It was originally constructed and used by the now defunct, Lewis College, and was listed on the National Register of Historic Places in 1969.

References

External links
Lewis Library

Libraries on the National Register of Historic Places in Missouri
Italianate architecture in Missouri
Cultural infrastructure completed in 1866
Buildings and structures in Howard County, Missouri
National Register of Historic Places in Howard County, Missouri